Kalhara Peiris is a Sri Lankan cricketer. He made his List A debut for Matale District in the 2016–17 Districts One Day Tournament on 24 March 2017.

References

External links
 

Year of birth missing (living people)
Living people
Sri Lankan cricketers
Matale District cricketers
Place of birth missing (living people)